Shredding, shred, shredder, or shredders may refer to:

Equipment
 Industrial shredder
 Paper shredder
 Scrap metal shredder
 Woodchipper, or tree shredder

Arts, entertainment, and media

Films
 Shred (film), a 2008 film by David Mitchell
 Shredder (film), a 2003 film by Craig Donald Carlson and Greg Huson

Other uses in arts, entertainment, and media
 Shred guitar, a speed-based virtuoso style of electric guitar playing
 Shredder (Teenage Mutant Ninja Turtles), a supervillain in the Teenage Mutant Ninja Turtles franchise
 Shredders (music group), an American hip hop group
 Shredder, a 1973 album by The Wackers
 "Shredder", a 1998 single by Christopher Lawrence

Computing
 Shred (Unix), a Unix command for secure file deletion
 Shredder (software), a chess program developed by Stefan Meyer-Kahlen
 Shredding (data remanence), overwriting storage media with new data to erase it
 Shredding (disassembling genomic data), in bioinformatics
 Shredder, the alpha build of Mozilla Thunderbird

Sports
 Shredding, the activity of street skateboarding
 Shredding, an activity of skiing
 Shredding, an activity of snowboarding
 Shredding, an activity of mountain biking
 Shredding, an activity of bodybuilding also known as cutting

Other uses
 Shred Optics, a manufacturer of sunglasses, helmets, and goggles
 Shredder, an inflatable whitewater craft
 Shredding (tree-pruning technique)

See also
 Food processor, a small appliance that can shred
 Garbage disposal unit, of kitchen sinks (or its grinding component particularly)
 Grater, a kitchen tool that can shred foods
 Spoliation of evidence, a legal term for shredding of documents
 Stracciatella (disambiguation)